Karin Knapp was the defending champion but chose not to enter the tournament this year.
Nao Hibino won the title, defeating Donna Vekić in the final, 6–2, 6–2.

Seeds

Draw

Finals

Top half

Bottom half

Qualifying

Seeds

Qualifiers

Lucky losers

Draw

First qualifier

Second qualifier

Third qualifier

Fourth qualifier

References
Main Draw
Qualifying Draw

2015 WTA Tour
Singles